Kim Hyo-jung (Hangul: 김효정) is a South Korean archer who won the 1993 World Championships in Antalya.

References

South Korean female archers
World Archery Championships medalists
Living people
Year of birth missing (living people)
20th-century South Korean women